Abqaiq Airport is a small airstrip located 10 km west to the center of Abqaiq city in the Eastern Province of Saudi Arabia. It occupies an area of about 0.35 km2, surrounded by farms and desert. It is about 65 km southwest of Dammam, the Province's largest city. The closest major city, however, is Al-Mubarraz, which is located about 55 km to the south.

Overview 
Saudi Arabian Oil Company (Saudi Aramco) owns the airfield and used to operate it for its domestic flights around the kingdom, until it was abandoned from regular use due to the completion of the King Fahd International Airport in Dammam where Aramco operates its main aviation hub. There is no specific use for the airfield at the present time.

Facilities
There is one runway, 1,850 meters long and 32 meters wide. Two parking/gates can be found there for medium-sized airplanes.

Parking
A large parking lot is located just outside the terminal.

Airports in Saudi Arabia
Saudi Aramco